Loutro (Greek: Λουτρό) is a village in northern Aetolia-Acarnania, West Greece. It belongs to the municipality of Amfilochia. Loutro is the birthplace of the fighter of the Greek War of Independence, Ioannis Stratos and Greek Prime Minister Nikolaos Stratos.

See also
List of settlements in Aetolia-Acarnania

Populated places in Aetolia-Acarnania